The following highways are numbered 239:

Australia 
 Borung Highway

Canada
 Manitoba Provincial Road 239
 Newfoundland and Labrador Route 239
 Nova Scotia Route 239
 Prince Edward Island Route 239
 Quebec Route 239

Costa Rica
 National Route 239

Japan
 Japan National Route 239

United States
 Arkansas Highway 239
 Arkansas Highway 239 Spur
 Alabama State Route 239
 California State Route 239
 Colorado State Highway 239
 Florida State Road 239 (former)
 Georgia State Route 239 (former)
 Iowa Highway 239 (former)
 K-239 (Kansas highway)
 Kentucky Route 239
 Maryland Route 239
 M-239 (Michigan highway)
 Montana Secondary Highway 239
 New York State Route 239 (former)
 Ohio State Route 239
 Pennsylvania Route 239
 South Dakota Highway 239
 Tennessee State Route 239
 Texas State Highway 239
 Texas State Highway Loop 239
 Texas State Highway Spur 239
 Utah State Route 239 (former)
 Virginia State Route 239
 Wyoming Highway 239